The Fern Lake Patrol Cabin in Rocky Mountain National Park was designed by National Park Service landscape Daniel Ray Hull and built in 1925. The National Park Service Rustic cabin was used for a time as a ranger station. It was destroyed by the East Troublesome Fire in 2020.  It was listed on the National Register of Historic Places in 1988, and was delisted in 2022, after being destroyed by the East Troublesome Fire

See also
National Register of Historic Places listings in Larimer County, Colorado

References

Houses on the National Register of Historic Places in Colorado
Houses completed in 1925
Houses in Larimer County, Colorado
Log cabins in the United States
National Register of Historic Places in Rocky Mountain National Park
Park buildings and structures on the National Register of Historic Places in Colorado
National Register of Historic Places in Larimer County, Colorado
Log buildings and structures on the National Register of Historic Places in Colorado
1925 establishments in Colorado
National Park Service rustic in Colorado
Former National Register of Historic Places in Colorado